Ralph Fletcher (1780 – 8 February 1851) was an English surgeon and animal welfare writer. He authored the first casebook of psychosomatic medicine.

Biography

Fletcher was born in Gloucester. Fletcher was educated at St Bartholomew's Hospital and studied medicine at the Gloucester County Hospital under Charles Brandon Trye. He obtained his M.D. from the University of Edinburgh. He established his own medical practice in Barton Street, Gloucester. Fletcher operated one of the finest consulting practices in England and his consultations extended beyond his county to the whole of South Wales. In 1811, he became surgeon to the Gloucester Infirmary and to the Gloucester Lunatic Asylum. He was promoted to consultant surgeon at the infirmary in 1833. He was mayor of Gloucester during 1818–1819 and 1828–1829.

Fletcher was able to recognise how emotional factors influence symptoms and the recovery from illness. In 1833, he published the first casebook of psychosomatic medicine. He described patients whose symptoms were psychosomatic and were cured without recourse to drugs or surgery.

Animal welfare

Fletcher took interest in animal welfare and was President of the Society for the Prevention of Cruelty to Animals in Gloucester. In 1846, he authored an early work on animal welfare, A Few Notes on Cruelty to Animals. The book was positively reviewed in the London Medical Gazette, The Athenaeum and The Veterinary Record. The book exposed animal cruelties in the Gloucester area such as badger-baiting, cat mutilation, calves beaten, overloaded dog and donkey carts, horses beaten and over-worked, deer hunting and pig starvation. Fletcher recommended general hospitals for animals similar to human hospitals.

Fletcher commented that we should show respect for "the interest and feelings of every sentient being that holds life." Upon walking the streets of London, Fletcher would stop and look at poor jaded cab-horses and give a shilling to the cabman who was most attentive to his horses as a way of encouragement. He bequeathed £15 per annum to support the cats he had fed when he was alive.

Publications

Medico-Chirurgical Notes and Illustrations (1831)
Sketches from the Case Book: To Illustrate the Influence of the Mind on the Body (1833)
A Few Notes on Cruelty to Animals (1846)

Quotes

References

1780 births
1851 deaths
18th-century English medical doctors
19th-century English medical doctors
Alumni of the University of Edinburgh Medical School
British animal welfare scholars
British animal welfare workers
English surgeons
People from Gloucester